Alain Masudi (born 12 February 1978) is a Congolese former professional footballer who played as a striker or midfielder.

He was part of the Congolese 2004 African Nations Cup team, who finished bottom of their group in the first round of competition, thus failing to secure qualification for the quarter-finals. Masudi managed to score the only goal for Congo in the competition.

In 2004 Masudi first ventured into Israeli football playing for Bnei Sakhnin.
For the 2005–06 season, Masudi moved on to play for the newly promoted Maccabi Netanya in the Israeli Premier League.

During the close season of 2006, Masudi moved to his third Israeli club, Maccabi Haifa and in the 2007–08 season he played in F.C. Ashdod and Maccabi Tel Aviv.

On 26 June 2008, he decided to join Daniel Jammer's Maccabi Netanya after having troubles with officials from Maccabi Tel Aviv. On 29 July 2008, he was released from the team after he requested to extend the contract.

On 12 September 2008, Masudi agreed on a one-year-contract with Maccabi Herzliya from the second league. Masudi will reunite with Eyal Lahman, the man who brought him to Israel four years ago to Bnei Sakhnin.

On 30 July 2009, Dalian Shide signed Masudi with a contract worth $330,000 for a season and a half.

In July 2010 he returned to Israel and agreed again on a one-year deal with Herzlyia in the second league.

In June 2011 he made his return to the Israeli Premier League as he will be a part of the newly promoted Ironi Nir Ramat HaSharon in their debut season in the top flight.

Honours
 Austrian Bundesliga: Runner-up: 2001–02
 ÖFB-Cup: Runner-up: 2002
 Libyan Premier League: Runner-up: 2003–04

External links

1978 births
Living people
Democratic Republic of the Congo football managers
Association football forwards
Democratic Republic of the Congo footballers
SC Bastia players
Nîmes Olympique players
AS Saint-Étienne players
FC Lausanne-Sport players
SK Sturm Graz players
Bnei Sakhnin F.C. players
Maccabi Netanya F.C. players
Maccabi Haifa F.C. players
F.C. Ashdod players
Maccabi Tel Aviv F.C. players
Maccabi Herzliya F.C. players
Dalian Shide F.C. players
Hapoel Nir Ramat HaSharon F.C. players
Maccabi Ahi Nazareth F.C. players
Ligue 1 players
Swiss Super League players
Austrian Football Bundesliga players
Israeli Premier League players
Chinese Super League players
Liga Leumit players
2004 African Cup of Nations players
Democratic Republic of the Congo expatriate footballers
Democratic Republic of the Congo international footballers
Expatriate footballers in France
Expatriate footballers in Switzerland
Expatriate footballers in Austria
Expatriate footballers in Libya
Expatriate footballers in Israel
Expatriate footballers in China
Democratic Republic of the Congo expatriate sportspeople in France
Democratic Republic of the Congo expatriate sportspeople in Switzerland
Democratic Republic of the Congo expatriate sportspeople in Libya
Democratic Republic of the Congo expatriate sportspeople in Israel
Democratic Republic of the Congo expatriate sportspeople in China
Footballers from Kinshasa
21st-century Democratic Republic of the Congo people